Casa Manila is a museum in Intramuros depicting colonial lifestyle during Spanish colonization of the Philippines.

The museum is the imposing stone-and-wood structure c. 1850, one of the grand houses in Barrio San Luis (one of  the four original villages of Intramuros) is located across historic San  Agustin church and bounded by Calle Real, General Luna, Cabildo and  Urdaneta streets. The other two are the Los Hidalgos, c. 1650 and Cuyugan Mansion, c. 1890.

Casa Manila is a copy of an 1850s San Nicolas House that was once located in Calle Jaboneros. The architect of Casa Manila was J. Ramon L. Faustmann.
It was constructed by Imelda Marcos during the 1980s and modeled on Spanish colonial architecture.

See also 

List of museums in the Philippines
International Council of Museums
International Museum Day (May 18)
Museum education
Virtual Library museums pages

References

Most visited museums

External links 

 Casa Manila Museum: A Description of Each Floor
 Casa Manila (Viator)
 Casa Manila: have you visited yet?
 Casa Manila Museum (Global Pinoy)
 Intramuros: Revisit the Past in Casa Manila (Newsflash) 
 Casa Manila Museum
List of Museums in the Philippines

International Council of Museums
VLmp directory of museums
Philippine Standard Geographic Code

Houses in Metro Manila
Museums in Manila
Buildings and structures in Intramuros
Art museums and galleries in the Philippines
Heritage Houses in the Philippines
Historic house museums in the Philippines
Landmarks in the Philippines
National Cultural Treasures of the Philippines
Spanish Colonial architecture in the Philippines
History of the Philippines (1565–1898)
History museums in the Philippines